Gurudas Dasgupta (3 November 1936 – 31 October 2019) was an Indian politician and a leader of the Communist Party of India. In the 1950s and 60s, he held several offices as a student leader. Later he was a member of Rajya Sabha for three terms from 1985 to 2000 and of Lok Sabha for two terms from 2004 to 2014.

Biography
Gurudas Dasgupta was born to Nihar Devi and Durga Prosanna Dasgupta on 3 November 1936 in Barisal, British India (now in Bangladesh). On 18 June 1965, he married Jayashri Das Gupta.

He entered politics as a student leader. He served as the General Secretary of Asutosh College Students' Union in 1957 as well as the President and General Secretary of Undivided Bengal Provincial Students' Federation from 1958 to 1960. In 1965, he was detained under the Defence of India rules. He went into hiding several times during the 1950s–60s.

Dasgupta was the General Secretary of the West Bengal Committee of All India Youth Federation from 1967 to 1977. He was also General Secretary of West Bengal Youth Festival Preparatory Committee in 1968, 1970 and 1973. He led the Indian delegation at the World Youth Congress held in Budapest in 1970.

He remained in Communist Party of India (CPI) following its split in 1964. In 1970s, he worked in the labour wing of the CPI. He served as the Vice President of All India Trade Union Congress and Bharatiya Khet Mazdoor Union.

He worked as a parliamentarian for 25 years. He was elected as a member of the Rajya Sabha in 1985, 1988 and 1994. Dasgupta was elected as the General Secretary of the All India Trade Union Congress (AITUC) in 2001. He was elected as a member of National Secretariat of CPI in 2004. In 2004, he was elected to the 14th Lok Sabha from Panskura in West Bengal. In 2009, he was elected to the 15th Lok Sabha from Ghatal in West Bengal. He was a member of the Joint Parliamentary Committee on the Harshad Mehta scam and on the 2G spectrum case.

Dasgupta died on 31 October 2019 due to complications of lung cancer.

References

|-

|-

1936 births
2019 deaths
People from Barisal
People from Barisal District
India MPs 2004–2009
India MPs 2009–2014
Trade unionists from West Bengal
Asutosh College alumni
University of Calcutta alumni
Communist Party of India politicians from West Bengal
Lok Sabha members from West Bengal
Rajya Sabha members from West Bengal
People from Paschim Medinipur district
Deaths from lung cancer